This is a list of public holidays in the Republic of Congo.

Movable holidays
The following holidays are public holidays but the date on which each occurs varies, according to its corresponding calendar, and thus has no set date. In order in which they occur:

Notes
New Year's Day, Easter, Labor Day, Independence Day, All Saints' Day and Christmas Day are widely recognized and celebrated holidays. The other holidays listed are officially recognized by the government's Department of Labor (Direction Départementale du Travail) and are granted to government workers; the government requires that businesses operating in the country also recognize them, though employees, if even familiar with them, tend to prefer working as usual (with government-mandated overtime wages) on those days.

References

Sources
Les jours fériés en République du Congo 

Lists of public holidays by country
Republic of the Congo culture
Republic of the Congo